William D. Lucey is a singer, songwriter, producer, and multi-instrumentalist best known for being a member and key songwriter for Irish rock band Rubyhorse, formed in 1987 with schoolmates Dave Farrell, Owen Fegan, Joe Philpott, and Gordon Ashe. More recently he has released two records under the nom de plume Leftbank, collaborating with Gordon Ashe on drums.

William was raised in County Cork, Ireland, and served as primary songwriter and bass player in Rubyhorse from 1988–2005, moving with the band to the US in 1997. The band had several major record deals with Interscope and Island records and appeared on the David Letterman show, Conan o Brian and had a Billboard top 20 hit with the song Sparkle.  When the band took a hiatus following the release of Goodbye to All That in 2005, he settled in Boston with his young family, before moving back to Ireland in 2015. He now spends the majority of his time at his studio "Milk Row Cemetery" writing music for documentaries and film. Ruby horse are also back in the studio recording new material.

Why Can't Man Be More Like Animals takes its name from a Pink Panther episode entitled Sink Pink.
"The sky on my Birthday" takes its name from a photograph taken by photographer Francine Weiss which also features on the cover art of the album
The song "When I'm gone" was featured in the closing credits of Episode 7 of Loudermilk , "Father of the year"https://seriestrack.com/show/loudermilk/season-1/55503/

Discography
Rubyhorse
A Lifetime in One Day (1995), Horse Trade
Mini Hummer EP (1998), Horse Trade
How Far Have You Come (2000), Horse Trade
Rise (2002), Island Records
Goodbye to All That (2005), Brash Music

Leftbank
Why Can't Man Be More Like Animals? (2011), Rive Gauche Records
The sky on my Birthday(2018),Rive Gauche Records

Awards
Eclectic song of the year- Independent Music Awards as chosen by Tom Waits
(see entry for Rubyhorse)

References

External links
 Rubyhorse website
 Rubyhorse on Myspace
 Leftbank
 Goodbye to All That review mentioning Decky Lucey on 2Walls Webzine 2004
 Brash Music site, News page, mentioning Decky Lucey
 Declan Lucey discography (incomplete)
 Rubyhorse on Answers.com

Irish rock musicians
Living people
Musicians from County Cork
Irish male singer-songwriters
Year of birth missing (living people)